Johan Markusson (born August 20, 1979) is a Swedish former professional ice hockey player. He played in the top tier Swedish Hockey League (SHL) with Brynäs IF and the Växjö Lakers. He spent the most notable time in his career with the Lakers, playing in 9 seasons with the club, leading the club as Captain through their promotion of the HockeyAllsvenskan to the SHL.

References

External links

1979 births
Living people
Brynäs IF players
IK Oskarshamn players
Swedish ice hockey right wingers
Växjö Lakers players
People from Gävle
Sportspeople from Gävleborg County